The Symphony No. 3 in B minor "Ilia Mourometz", Op. 42, is a large symphonic work by Russian composer Reinhold Glière. A program symphony, it depicts the life of Kievan Rus' folk hero Ilya Muromets. It was written from 1908 to 1911 and dedicated to Alexander Glazunov. The premier took place in Moscow on 23 March 1912 under Emil Cooper, and in 1914 the piece earned Glière his third Glinka Award (having already received it in 1905 and 1912).

Outline

The symphony lasts 70 to 80 minutes, and is divided into four sections, each depicting an episode from the epic. Glière wrote an extensive narrative in Russian and French to accompany the score.

I. Wandering Pilgrims: Ilya Muromets and Svyatogor

Andante sostenuto – Allegro risoluto. Two pilgrims tell Ilya to become a bogatyr. The most powerful bogatyr, Svyatogor, bequeaths his strength to Ilya as he dies.

II. Solovei the Brigand

Andante. Ilya encounters Solovei the Brigand, a bandit whose whistle can kill. Ilya shoots him in the eye with an arrow and drags his body to the palace of Prince Vladimir.

III. The Palace of Prince Vladimir

Allegro. Vladimir the Great of Kiev holds a great feast, at which Ilya decapitates Solovei.

IV. The Feats of Valor and the Petrification of Ilya Muromets

Allegro tumultuoso – Tranquillo – Maestoso solemne – Andante sostenuto. Ilya defeats Batygha the Wicked and his army of pagans in a great battle. Ilya and his bogatyrs later encounter two heavenly warriors who multiply each time they are killed; pushed to retreat, Ilya and his men are transformed into stone.

Instrumentation
The symphony calls for piccolo, 3 flutes, 3 oboes, cor anglais, 3 clarinets, bass clarinet, 3 bassoons, contrabassoon, 8 horns, 4 trumpets, 4 trombones, tuba, timpani, triangle, glockenspiel, snare drum, bass drum, gong, cymbals, celesta, 2 harps, and strings.

Recordings
The work was a favorite of Leopold Stokowski, who recorded it three times. In 1952 Hermann Scherchen recorded the complete work with the Vienna State Opera Orchestra for Westminster Records.

Some recordings have significant cuts in the last movement. Other recordings are:

 Downes, Sir Edward; BBC Philharmonic
 Faletta, JoAnn; Buffalo Philharmonic Orchestra
 Farberman, Harold; Royal Philharmonic Orchestra
 Feltz, Gabriel; Belgrade Philharmonic
 Johanos, Donald; Czecho-Slovak Radio Symphony Orchestra
 Rakhlin, Nathan; Moscow Radio & Television Symphony Orchestra

With significant cuts:

 Golovchin, Igor; USSR State Symphony Orchestra
 Ormandy, Eugene; Philadelphia Orchestra
 Rachmilovich, Jacques; St. Cecilia Academy Orchestra

References

External links
 

Compositions by Reinhold Glière
1911 compositions
Compositions in B minor
Gliere 3